Munther Suleiman Dajani Daoudi is Dean at Al Quds Bard Honors College and former Dean of the Faculty of Arts at Al-Quds University in Jerusalem and Director of the Issam Sartawi Centre for the Advancement of Peace and Democracy. He is also the co-founder of the Wasatiyya ("Moderation") movement that is committed to finding alternatives to extremism on both sides of the Israeli-Palestinian conflict. He has written extensively on Palestinian issues as well as on economics and democracy. From 1996 to 1997 he was Director General of the Palestinian Ministry of Economy and Trade. His next position was as Director of Research at the Palestinian Centre for Regional Studies, which he held until 1999. He then established Political Science and Diplomatic Studies at Al Quds University and became the department head.

Personal life 
Dajani was born in the old city of Jerusalem in Souk el Bazar on February 22, 1951, to Sulieman Dajani and Abla Aweidah. He is the youngest of four, two brothers Mohammed and Muhsen, and sister May.

The Dajani family is one of the prominent five families of Jerusalem, and Daoudi comes from being custodians of Prophet (King) David's Tomb on Mount Zion. The Dajani family has been the custodians of Prophet (King) David's Tomb on Mount Zion for eight hundred years.

Education 
Dajani began his education at the Friends School in Ramallah, continued at Victory College in Ma'adi, Egypt, then moved back to Jerusalem to graduate from St George's School. As all students of his generation, he has witnessed several major wars in the region and lived under occupation until he left Palestine to pursue education in the United States of America.

He earned his BSc degree in Management Systems and Social Sciences in 1974, and in 1975 he also earned a master's degree in Social Studies, Economics, History & Political Sciences. In 1981, he earned another master's degree, and later in 1982, he received his Doctoral degree from University Of Texas at Austin where he graduated with High Distinction in 1982. By the time he finished his Doctoral degree dissertation on Initiative for Peace in the Middle East: Conflict and Conflict Resolution, he and his elder brother Mohammed had two manuscripts at major publishing houses: Routledge, in London, where they published their first book in 1983, Economic Sanctions: Ideal and Experience, and Westview Press, in Colorado, where they published their second book on the Arab oil embargo.

Career 
Later on he moved to Amman and joined the University of Jordan in Amman where he published more than five books and several articles, and served in different capacities at the university and outside.

In 1995, Upon his father's death from cancer, Dajani left Jordan with his wife and three children to move back and settle in Jerusalem where he became a peace activist and a public servant as the Director General of the Ministry of Economy and Trade in Palestine. In the meantime, he was appointed Director to the Palestinian Center for Regional Studies (Pal-CRS), and he also taught as part-time Professor at both Birzeit University and Al Quds University until 1999.

Dajani resigned from three positions in PNA to go back to teaching. In 1999, he joined Al Quds University as Professor and Chair of the Political Science Department which he founded. Also served as Director of the Issam Sartawi Center for the Advancement of Peace. During this time, he participated in tens of conferences on the Peace Process, he was involved in second track diplomacy as a group of academics began to meet to overcome some of the complicated problems, and he was awarded several Medals and Awards' certificates by many International and regional organizations.

In January 2006, he was Knighted by the Italian President. Later that year in November, he attended the 28th World Federation Japanese Religionists Conference for World Peace in Tokyo, where he concluded that "The Palestinians have to give up their big dream of historical Palestine and to accept the 1967 borders for their State. Similarly, the Israelis have to give up their dream of Greater Israel and to accept the land of Israel to be within the 1948 borders." Two years later, in April 2008, he was one of the main speakers at the Doha Debates: "This House believes the Palestinians risk becoming their own worst enemy" in Qatar.

Today, Dr. Dajani is a professor of Political Science and Dean of the Faculty of Arts at Al Quds University. On August 10, 2010, he was recommended for his work by colleague Samira Barghouthi, the Vice President of International Cooperation at the university, for being a good speaker on issues in the fields of Humanities. "I heard him a few times speaking about the politics in the Middle East and it was fascinating how he blends the presentation of facts, analyses the possible future solutions, and ties everything to history in a subtle way", she says "Munther is the most caring Dean as he treats both students and Faculty with the utmost respect and patience".

See also 
Wasatiyyah Institute Malaysia

References

External links 
 M. S. Dajani Resume
 An Article about Dr. Dajani on Oberlin's Website
 Al Jazeera Commentaries on Doha Debates 2008
 

1951 births
Living people
University of Texas alumni
Academic staff of Birzeit University